Pseudocatharylla infixellus is a moth in the family Crambidae. It was described by Francis Walker in 1863. It is found in China (Shantung, Kiangsu, Kwangtung), Japan and Taiwan.

References

Crambinae
Moths described in 1863